Aliens are to Blame for Everything is a 1991 Yugoslav film by Zoran Čalić starring Bata Živojinović, Boro Stjepanović, Nikola Simić and others. The film is also known as Ćao inspektore, III deo ("Bye, Inspector, Part III").

Plot
The election campaign in a small provincial town is in full swing. Candidates for ministry position pop up elsewhere, promising "milk and honey" to the voters. Two inseparable policemen, Boki and Pajko, are in charge of peace and order. Everything goes as usual until unexpected visitor from space shows up.

External links

1991 films
Yugoslav science fiction films
Serbian science fiction films
Films set in Belgrade
1991 science fiction films
Films shot in Belgrade
1990s Serbian-language films